The IBM 5120 Computing System (sometimes referred to as the IBM 5110 Model 3) was announced in February 1980 as the desktop follow-on to the IBM 5110 Computing System. It featured two built-in 8-inch 1.2 MB floppy disk drives, 9-inch monochrome monitor, 32KB RAM and optional IBM 5114 stand-alone diskette unit with two additional 8-inch 1.2 MB floppy disk drives.  The system was sold with both APL and BASIC languages in ROM and provided a toggle switch on the front panel to select the language. APL allowed numerous business software written on IBM minicomputers to run on the 5120.

Description
It was launched in 1980 as the lowest-priced IBM business computer to date. Depending on the options the overall system prices ranged from $9,340 to $23,990. To emphasize its office image IBM released in that same year 6 new programs: task inventory, billing, payroll, accounts payable, accounts receivable and general ledger accounting. 

Aside from larger screen size and performance benefits over its predecessor, the IBM 5120 design incorporated several usability advantages:
 Reduced 'footprint' requiring less desktop space
 Reduced glare on monitor, keytop and product surfaces
 Ease of handling/lifting based on bottom form treatment
 Reduced static loading in arms and shoulders due to keyboard palm rest

For its usability features and appearance, the IBM 5120 was recognized with two major industrial design awards and described with terms such as "clean, well thought out"; "subtle detailing shows great care in execution"; and "looks like quality″.

IBM did not offer a LAN or hard disk drive for these systems. However, in 1981, Hal Prewitt, founder of Core International, Inc, invented and marketed the world's first and only hard disk subsystems and "CoreNet", a LAN used to share programs and data for the IBM 5110 and 5120 systems. In 1984, Core introduced PC51, software that allowed 5100 Series computer programs written in BASIC to run unmodified on the IBM PC and compatibles under PC DOS and share programs and data on CoreNet, the LAN for all these models.

References

  Core 5110/20 Hard Drives
 1984 Core PC51 Users Manual
 1984 Core PC51 Media Release

5120
Computer-related introductions in 1980